Cormac Cullinan is a practising environmental attorney and author based in Cape Town, South Africa. He is a director of the leading South African environmental law firm, Cullinan & Associates Inc, and director of the Wild Law Institute, a non-profit organisation that advocates for Rights of Nature. A former commercial lawyer, he has practiced, taught and written about environmental law and policy since 1992, and has worked in more than 20 countries.

In the academic field he has lectured and written widely on governance issues related to human interactions with the environment and is notable for authoring a book, Wild Law, as well as several works commissioned and published by the Food and Agriculture Organization of the United Nations.  He is a graduate of the University of Natal and King's College London and is an honorary research associate of the University of Cape Town.

His work includes drafting: the Integrated Coastal Management Bill now before Parliament, the agreement between South Africa, Namibia and Angola that established the Benguela Current Commission; waste legislation for KwaZulu Natal and legislation for sustainable land use in the Western Cape.

In 2008 he was listed among the world's most extraordinary environmental champions in Planet Savers: 301 Extraordinary Environmentalists, which lists 301 people in history to be commended for their important role in saving and conserving the environment and promoting sustainable governance, including the likes of Buddha, St Francis of Assisi and Henry Thoreau.

In 2016, Cullinan was included in Warrior Lawyers: From Manila to Manhattan, Attorneys for the Earth. In 2021 he won the Nicke Steele award for the South African environmentalist of the year and in 2018 received the Enviropaedia Ecologic lifetime achievement award.

Rights of Nature 

Cullinan has led the drafting of the Universal Declaration of the Rights of Mother Earth and is a founder and Executive Committee member of the Global Alliance for Rights of Nature. He drafted the Peoples’ Convention that established the International Tribunal on the Rights of Nature, and was the president of the Tribunal hearings in December 2015 in Paris. Between 2019 and 2021, Cullinan served as the president of the European Tribunal on the Rights of Nature. He has addressed conferences throughout the world on Earth Jurisprudence and the rights of Nature, including the UN General Assembly in 2011.

Selected publications 

Wild Law: A Manifesto for Earth Justice, first published by Siber Ink, Cape Town, South Africa, August 2002 ; also by Green Books, Totnes, Devon, 2003 .

"Integrated Coastal Management Law" Establishing and strengthening National Legal Frameworks for Integrated Coastal Management, FAO Legislative Study No. 93, Rome, 2006.

Recent trends in monitoring, control and surveillance systems for capture fisheries, by P Flewelling; C Cullinan; RP Sautter and JE Reynolds. FAO Fisheries Technical Paper 415, Rome, FAO, 2002.

"Law and markets - Improving the legal environment for agricultural marketing" FAO, 2000, AGS Bulletin, No. 139.
"Land Ownership and Foreigners: A Comparative Analysis of Regulatory Approaches to the Acquisition and Use of Land by Foreigners." FAO Legal Papers Online, 1999.

Author of legal section of Integrated coastal area management and agriculture, forestry and fisheries.  FAO Guidelines (N Scialabba (ed.) Environment and Natural Resource Service, FAO, Rome. 256p.

Legal and institutional aspects of integrated coastal area management in national legislation.  FAO Legislative study, 1994 (118 pages).

'If Nature Had Rights', Orion, USA, January 2008.

Mentions and related literature 

Simon Boyle, 'On thin ice', The Guardian newspaper, London, November 2006.

Stephen Harding, 'Earthly rights', The Guardian newspaper, London, April 2007.

Silver Donald Cameron, 'When does a tree have rights?', The Chronicle Herald (Halifax, Nova Scotia), January, 2007.

'SA lawyer an eco-warrior', News24, Southern African and African news website, February 2008.

Sue Segar, 'Planet Saver from PMB', article in The Witness, April 2008.

External links 
 Cullinan & Associates Inc, a specialist environmental law firm, based in Cape Town, South Africa. View Cullinan's CV.
 Wild Law Institute, a non-profit organisation advocating the Rights of Nature.
 Wild Law Forum An online forum launched in September 2007 for the discussion of Wild Law.

Living people
Alumni of King's College London
International law scholars
Non-fiction environmental writers
20th-century South African lawyers
Writers from Cape Town
Academic staff of the University of Cape Town
20th-century South African writers
21st-century South African writers
Year of birth missing (living people)
Rights of nature
21st-century South African lawyers